The Tokyo salamander (Hynobius tokyoensis) is a species of salamander in the family Hynobiidae, endemic to Japan. Its natural habitats are temperate forests, freshwater springs, arable land, irrigated land, and canals and ditches. It is threatened by habitat loss. 
Many different species of amphibian have unbalanced sex ratios. This trend is no different in Hynobius Tokyoensis; the sex ratio between males and females is about 1.5:1. Although this does not play as large of a role as habitat destruction when it comes to the decline of this species, it is still significant. Considering their environmental preferences, they are usually found in paddy fields. Mid-Summer drainage from these fields hinders the population's ability to thrive as this would occur before these populations could complete metamorphosis.

References

Hynobius
Endemic amphibians of Japan
Amphibians described in 1931
Taxonomy articles created by Polbot
Taxa named by Katsuya Tago